The part program is a sequence of instructions, which describe the work, which has to be done on a part, in the form required by a computer under the control of computer numerical control (CNC) software. It is the task of preparing a program sheet from a drawing sheet. All data is fed into the CNC system using a standardized format. Programming is where all the machining data are compiled and where the data are translated into a language which can be understood by the control system of the machine tool. 

The machining data is as follows : 

 Machining sequence classification of process, tool start up point, cutting depth, tool path, etc. 
 Cutting conditions, spindle speed, feed rate, coolant, etc. 
 Selection of cutting tools.

See also
G-code

References
FUNDAMENTALS OF PART PROGRAMMING

Computer-aided engineering